Taverner is an English-language occupational surname. Notable people with the surname include:

 John le Taverner (fl. 1295–1313), MP for Bristol
 John Taverner (c. 1490–1545), Renaissance English composer
 John Tavener (1944–2013), English composer
 Richard Taverner (1505–1575), author of Taverner's Bible, a 16th-century translation of the Bible
 Percy A. Taverner (1875–1947), Canadian ornithologist
 William J. Taverner, American sex educator

Fictional characters
 Jason Taverner, the main character in Philip K. Dick's novel Flow My Tears, the Policeman Said

See also

English-language occupational surnames